James Rutherford (24 October 1827 – 13 September 1911) was a transport pioneer in Australia.

Early life
Rutherford was born in Amherst, Erie County, New York, U.S.A., second son of James Rutherford and his wife Hetty, née Milligan.
  Rutherford became a school-teacher and around 1852 decided to try his luck in the California Gold Rush, where his brother was. Unable to find a ship to take him there, Rutherford instead decided to travel to Australia.

Career in Australia

Rutherford arrived at Melbourne on the Akbar on 20 June 1853 and worked on the Bendigo goldfields for a short time before becoming a contractor timber-cutter near Ferntree Gully, Victoria. Rutherford then sailed to Brisbane and travelled overland back to Melbourne and on the way learnt a great deal about the country, and much about its horses, in which he traded for some years. The coaching business of Cobb and Co., which had been founded by some visitors from America a few years before, was in 1857 in the hands of Cyrus Hewitt and George Watson, who employed Rutherford to manage the Beechworth line. In 1861 Rutherford formed a syndicate (including Walter Russell Hall) and bought out Hewitt and Watson for the sum of £23,000.

Rutherford became general manager and the business steadily expanded. He was an excellent manager, a fine judge of horses and men, and maintained good relations between the management and the employees. In June 1862 Rutherford moved ten coaches from the Castlemaine, Victoria Depot in Victoria to Bathurst, New South Wales and re-established the company's headquarters there. Extensions into Queensland were made in 1865, and the growth of the business was so great that by 1870 6,000 horses were harnessed each day and the coaches were travelling 28,000 miles a week. Rutherford, who lived at Bathurst from 1862, began acquiring station properties, which he managed himself with the most up-to-date means, and in 1873, with John Sutherland, and others including ironmaster Enoch Hughes, he founded the Eskbank Ironworks at Lithgow. This started with a capital of £100,000 all of which had been lost when Rutherford took over its management. Rutherford succeeded in making the ironworks pay its way, but there was little profit in it and the business was eventually sold to William Sandford.

At Bathurst, Rutherford became a member of the council, had a term as mayor in 1868, and was treasurer to the Agricultural Society for 30 years. He encouraged the planting of trees in the town, and exercised an open-handed philanthropy. During his long period as governing-director of Cobb and Co., he kept in touch with his large station-properties, riding large distances as a young man, and later often travelling in a kind of Cape cart.

Even in his eighties he continued the supervision of his stations, and he died at Mackay, Queensland, on 13 September 1911, when returning from a visit to one of them. He left a widow, five sons, and five daughters.   He was then considered one of the wealthiest men in New South Wales.

Legacy

Cobb and Co. was a household word in the out-country in the second half of the nineteenth century.  Scottish-Australian poet and balladeer Will H. Ogilvie (1869–1963) and Australian poet Henry Lawson among Australian writers both paid their tribute to "The Lights of Cobb and Co.", and certainly at this time Australia owed much to the untiring energy and management skills of James Rutherford.

References

1827 births
1911 deaths
Settlers of Australia
19th-century Australian businesspeople